Maura McHugh (born June 20, 1953) is a former basketball coach who has coached at the college level, in the WNBA and ABL. She was a four-year starter at Old Dominion University in the early 1970s. She was one of the first women's basketball players in the nation to receive a scholarship. She began as a graduate assistant coach at Penn State University before being promoted to assistant coach for two seasons. Her first head coaching position was at the University of Oklahoma where she coached for seven seasons. She followed up her time at Oklahoma with six years at Arizona State University. She also coached the now defunct Long Beach Stingrays of the ABL for one year in 1997–98 and followed that up with a stint as both assistant coach and head coach for the Sacramento Monarchs of the WNBA. Most recently, she served as head coach of the women's basketball program at Stony Brook University from 2003 to 2007.

References

1953 births
Sacramento Monarchs coaches
Oklahoma Sooners women's basketball coaches
Living people
American women's basketball coaches
Basketball coaches from Massachusetts
Basketball players from Massachusetts
Arizona State Sun Devils women's basketball coaches